Fritz Ligges (29 July 1938 in Asseln – 21 May 1996 in Herbern) was a German equestrian and Olympic champion. He won a gold medal in show jumping with the West German team at the 1972 Summer Olympics in Munich.

Ligges was later coach for the national junior team of Germany.

References

1938 births
1996 deaths
German male equestrians
Olympic equestrians of West Germany
Olympic equestrians of the United Team of Germany
Olympic gold medalists for West Germany
Olympic bronze medalists for West Germany
Olympic bronze medalists for the United Team of Germany
Equestrians at the 1964 Summer Olympics
Equestrians at the 1972 Summer Olympics
Equestrians at the 1984 Summer Olympics
German sports coaches
Olympic medalists in equestrian
Medalists at the 1984 Summer Olympics
Medalists at the 1972 Summer Olympics
Medalists at the 1964 Summer Olympics